Mikiko (written: 幹子, 美樹子, 美起子, 美紀子, 美希子 or みきこ in hiragana) is a feminine Japanese given name. Notable people with the name include:

, Japanese weightlifter
, Japanese voice actress
, Japanese women's basketball player
, Japanese photographer
, Japanese handball player
, Japanese actress
, known professionally as MIKIKO, Japanese choreographer
Mikiko Ponczeck (born 1984), German-Japanese comic book artist
, Japanese politician
, Japanese high jumper
, Japanese sprint canoeist

Japanese feminine given names